SV Babelsberg 03 is a German association football club based in Potsdam-Babelsberg, on the outskirts of Berlin. The team was founded as Sport-Club Jugendkraft 1903 and again as SG Karl-Marx Babelsberg in 1948 as successor to the pre-war side SpVgg Potsdam 03.

History

Playing as SV Nowawes the team gained promotion in 1935 to the first tier Gauliga Berlin-Brandenburg, one of sixteen top flight divisions formed in the re-organization of German football under the Third Reich. The club was relegated after just three seasons at that level never finishing better than eighth in their ten team division. The club returned to the Gauliga as SpVgg Potsdam in 1943 and earned third- and fourth-place finishes in the two years before the end of World War II.

Postwar play in East Germany

Following the war, occupying Allied authorities ordered the dissolution of all organizations in the country, including sports and football associations. The former membership of SpVgg was re-organized as SG Karl Marx Babelsberg in 1948 in the Soviet-occupied eastern half of the country. On 1 August 1949, they merged with the local club SG Drewitz and the following year were renamed BSG Motor Babelsberg.

The side was a perennial second division team in East Germany's DDR-Liga with the exception of short spells in the third tier in 1968–71, 1972–73, and 1980–81. The club's record in league matches and in regular FDGB-Pokal (East German Cup) tournament appearances was undistinguished. Just prior to German reunification the team suffered relegation from the second division.

Post-unification
On 10 December 1991 Motor adopted the name Sportverein Babelsberg 03. They remained a lower division side in the united Germany until breaking through to the NOFV-Oberliga Nord (IV) in 1996. The team's budget increased tenfold in the period from 1996 to 1999. They immediately captured the league title there and won promotion to the Regionalliga Nordost (III). A second-place finish in 2001 in what had become the Regionalliga Nord (III) advanced the club to the 2. Bundesliga. SV also played its first DFB-Pokal (German Cup) matches in 2000 and 2001, but was eliminated in the early rounds.

Babelsberg's time in the second division was a short one. They finished at the bottom of the table and by 2003–04 had fallen all the way back to the Oberliga (IV). The club declared bankruptcy in 2003 but managed to continue playing through the adoption of a creditor supported bankruptcy plan. SV fielded strong sides and achieved several top three finishes until they were promoted to the Regionalliga Nord (III) for the 2007–08 campaign. In 2009–10 season Babelsberg were promoted back to the 3. Liga after finishing champions of the Regionalliga Nord. After three seasons at this level the club was relegated again in 2013 and now plays in the Regionalliga Nordost again.

Supporters

Filmstadt Inferno 99 are the clubs ultras group. The fanatics stand in the North part of the stadium. The supporters hold left-wing and anti-fascist political views. As a result, they have strong friendships with St. Pauli and Celtic. They also had a strong friendship with Partizan Minsk, but this was discontinued after the club was disbanded.

Babelsberg 03 have a fierce rivalry with nearby club Energie Cottbus, a faction of whose supporters hold far-right political views.

Honours
The club's honours:
 Bezirksliga Potsdam (III)
 Champions: 1973
 Bezirksliga Potsdam-Süd  (III)
 Champions: 1981
 Verbandsliga Brandenburg (V)
 Champions: 1996
 NOFV-Oberliga Nord (IV)
 Champions: 1997, 2007
 Regionalliga Nord (III-IV)
 Champions: 2010
 Runners-up: 2001
 Brandenburg Cup
 Winners: 1999, 2000, 2006–2011, 2016, 2021
 Runners-up: 2001, 2005, 2012, 2014, 2020

Current squad

References

External links

 Official website 
 The Abseits Guide to German Soccer
 Ultras website 

 
Football clubs in Germany
Football clubs in East Germany
Football clubs in Brandenburg
Sport in Potsdam
Association football clubs established in 1903
1903 establishments in Germany
Works association football clubs in Germany
2. Bundesliga clubs
3. Liga clubs